Hans Marchand (1 October 1907 – 13 December 1978) was a German linguist. He studied Romance languages, English and Latin, and after fleeing Germany during the Third Reich was a lecturer of linguistics at Istanbul, Yale University, and Bard College. From 1957 to 1973 he was a professor at the University of Tübingen.

Marchand published works on linguistic phenomena occurring in languages such as English, French, Turkish and Italian, but became famous in his discipline for his theories on word-formation in the English language. Linguists following his approach are called Marchandeans.

References

Further reading
Štekauer, Pavol. English word formation: A history of research, 1960–1995. Tübingen: Gunter Narr, 2000. . See particularly chapter 1, "Hans Marchand" (pp. 29–48). Available at Google Books.

1907 births
1978 deaths
People from Krefeld
Linguists from Germany
German expatriates in the United States
German expatriates in Turkey
20th-century linguists
Morphologists
Academic staff of the University of Tübingen
Academic staff of Istanbul University